John Foster of Dunleer (born 1665-died 16 May 1747) was elected member to the Irish House of Commons for the constituency of Dunleer, in County Louth. He formerly held the position of Mayor of Dunleer Corporation.

He was the son of Colonel Anthony Foster of Dunleer, whose father Samuel had come to Ireland from Cumberland. He married in 1704 Elizabeth Fortescue, youngest daughter of William Fortescue of Newrath, County Louth, and first cousin to William Henry Fortescue, 1st Earl of Clermont. They had six children:
   Anthony Foster, Chief Baron of the Irish Exchequer
   Rev Thomas Foster DD
   John William Foster, MP for Dunleer. This, while widely quoted, seems to be incorrect. John had a son William Foster who married Patience Fowke, and John William Foster, MP for Dunleer, was their son
   Margaret Foster who married Stephen Sibthorpe
   Charlotte Foster who married Nicholas Forster
   Alice Foster who married Thomas Bolton.
   Rhoda Foster who married Roger Anketell

References

17th-century Anglo-Irish people
18th-century Anglo-Irish people
Members of the Parliament of Ireland (pre-1801) for County Louth constituencies
Politicians from County Louth
1747 deaths
Year of birth unknown
1665 births